The 2021–22 Grand Canyon Antelopes men's basketball team represented Grand Canyon University during the 2021–22 NCAA Division I men's basketball season. They are led by head coach Bryce Drew in his second season. The Antelopes play their home games at GCU Arena in Phoenix, Arizona as members of the Western Athletic Conference.

Previous season 
The 2020–21 Antelopes won the WAC regular season championship and the 2021 WAC men's basketball tournament.  The 2020–21 team is the first ever Grand Canyon team to be selected for March Madness, being selected as a 15-seed in the West region for the 2021 NCAA Division I men's basketball tournament, where they lost to Iowa in the first round.

Roster

Schedule and results

|-
!colspan=12 style=| Exhibition

|-
!colspan=12 style=| Non-conference regular season

|-
!colspan=12 style=| WAC Conference Season

|-
!colspan=9 style=|WAC tournament

Source

See also 
2021–22 Grand Canyon Antelopes women's basketball team

References

Grand Canyon Antelopes men's basketball seasons
Grand Canyon
Grand Canyon Antelopes men's basketball
Grand Canyon Antelopes men's basketball